Maurice Lepage was a French diver. He competed in the men's 3 metre springboard event at the 1928 Summer Olympics.

References

Year of birth missing
Year of death missing
French male divers
Olympic divers of France
Divers at the 1928 Summer Olympics
Place of birth missing
20th-century French people